The 3rd constituency of the Vosges is a French legislative constituency in the Vosges département.

Description

The 3rd constituency of Vosges covers the south-eastern section of the Department, bordering Alsace to the east and Franche-Comté to the south. It includes the western Vosges mountains and a number of small towns and villages including Remiremont.

It has elected members of the National Assembly from the Gaullist right throughout the Fifth Republic apart from in the Socialist landslide of 1981.

Historic representation

Election results

2022

 
 
|-
| colspan="8" bgcolor="#E9E9E9"|
|-

2017

 
 
 
 
 
 
|-
| colspan="8" bgcolor="#E9E9E9"|
|-

2012

 
 
 
 
|-
| colspan="8" bgcolor="#E9E9E9"|
|-

2007

 
 
 
 
 
 
 
|-
| colspan="8" bgcolor="#E9E9E9"|
|-

2002

 
 
 
 
 
|-
| colspan="8" bgcolor="#E9E9E9"|
|-

1997

 
 
 
 
 
 
 
 
|-
| colspan="8" bgcolor="#E9E9E9"|
|-

Sources
Official results of French elections from 2002: "Résultats électoraux officiels en France" (in French).

3